Countess is a locality in Alberta, Canada.

References 

Localities in the County of Newell